The Syrian Special Mission Forces are a Quick reaction force of the Ministry of Interior. They are tasked with defending against terrorist attacks on government-controlled parts of Aleppo and Damascus, and other urban settings.

Equipment
The unit has received self-defence training and military-grade weapons from Russia. The unit is comparable to the Russian ODON.
The SSMF uses Russian-suppiled AK-103 and AK-104 as the main service rifles, the former main rifles were the AK-47 and most likely, the AKM as well.

According to Al-Masdar News, the Special Mission Forces are mainly, although not exclusively, intended for urban security actions, as well as carrying out force protection and security operations against terrorist activities.

Battles 
They are noted to have performed well in thwarting attacks by terrorists in the western suburbs and Old City of Aleppo and foiling random attacks by terrorists in the Old City and western suburbs. Not limited to city defense, the Syrian Special Mission Forces have attacked behind enemy lines during the Syrian Army’s East Ghouta offensive. They are more experienced than the National Defence Forces in that many are experienced military officers, some with experience in the Syrian Special Forces. It is anticipated that after the war is over and the conflict in the area dissipates, they will help contribute in the rebuilding of Syria.

See also 
 Law enforcement in Syria
 Syrian Public Security Police

Notes

Pro-government factions of the Syrian civil war
Non-military counterinsurgency organizations
2014 establishments in Syria
Law enforcement in Syria
Special forces of Syria